is a Japanese actress, singer, and voice actress. She was part of Takarazuka Revue's Snow Troupe and Flower Troupe. During her time in the Revue, she specialized in female roles (musumeyaku). She was the musumeyaku top star from 1995 to 1996.

Career
Junna was born on March 15, 1971, in Minoh, Osaka, and grew up in the nearby Toyonaka. Her parents were both junior high school teachers. Her father taught English and her mother taught physical education.

In March 1988, she passed the audition for Takarazuka Music School and subsequently entered the school. She trained for two years and graduated at the top of her class. She joined the Takarazuka Revue in 1990. Her first stage was in Flower Troupe's The Rose of Versailles: Fersen. Due to her singing ability, she was chosen to be the etoile (the singer in the last scene). From then on she was part of the Snow Troupe.

In 1994, following encouragement from the troupe, she auditioned and was chosen to star in NHK's 51st asadora Piano. She took one year off from the revue for the drama. After returning in 1995, she transferred to the Flower Troupe. She made her top musumeyaku debut that same year, starring alongside Miki Maya in East of Eden/Dandyism! Her final stage was How to Succeed in 1996. Since her retirement, she has had success as an actress in television, film, and commercials.

In 2001, she starred alongside Anita Mui and Simon Yam in the 2001 Hong Kong film Midnight Fly. She also sang its theme song. The film was nominated for nine Golden Horse Awards (including Best Supporting Actress and Best Original Film Song for Junna) and won one for Best Original Film Song.

Stage

Filmography

Discography

Albums
 [1995.09.21] Propose
 [2007.08.22] Misty Moon
 [2015.10.21] Silent Love (Anata o Omou 12 no Uta)

Singles
 [1994.08.21] "Pīka Pika"
 [1995.09.06] "Propose"

References

External links
 

1971 births
Living people
Actresses from Osaka
Asadora lead actors
Japanese film actresses
Japanese musical theatre actresses
Japanese television actresses
Japanese voice actresses
Japanese women pop singers
Musicians from Osaka
Takarazuka Revue
20th-century Japanese actresses
20th-century Japanese women singers
20th-century Japanese singers
21st-century Japanese actresses
21st-century Japanese women singers
21st-century Japanese singers
People from Minoh, Osaka
People from Toyonaka, Osaka